Scarborough—Guildwood is a federal electoral district in Toronto, Ontario, Canada, that has been represented in the House of Commons of Canada since 2004.

It was created in 2003 from parts of Scarborough East, Scarborough Southwest and Scarborough Centre.

This riding lost territory to Scarborough—Rouge Park and Scarborough Southwest, and gained territory from Scarborough Centre during the 2012 electoral redistribution.

Geography
It is centred on the Guildwood neighbourhood. It consists of the part of the City of Toronto bounded by a line drawn from Lake Ontario north along Markham Road, west along Eglinton Avenue, north along Bellamy Road South, west along Lawrence Avenue, north along McCowan Road, east along Highway 401, south along Morningside Avenue back to Lake Ontario.

Presently, it contains the neighbourhoods of Guildwood, West Hill (west of Morningside Avenue), Morningside, Woburn, and Scarborough Village (east of Markham Road).

Demographics
According to the Canada 2021 Census

Ethnic groups: 36.2% South Asian, 22.2% White, 15.2% Black, 8.8% Filipino, 4.7% Chinese, 2.6% West Asian, 1.5% Latin American, 1.4% Indigenous, 1.3% Arab, 1.0% Southeast Asian 
Languages: 47.4% English, 6.8% Tamil, 5.2% Gujarati, 4.5% Tagalog, 3.0% Bengali, 2.9% Urdu, 1.7% Mandarin, 1.7% Cantonese, 1.4% Hindi, 1.3% Spanish, 1.3% Malayalam, 1.2% Dari, 1.1% Arabic, 1.1% Spanish, 1.0% Punjabi
Religions: 44.7% Christian (20.1% Catholic, 3.0% Christian Orthodox, 2.5% Anglican, 2.2% Pentecostal, 1.4% United Church, 1.2% Baptist, 14.3% Other), 18.5% Muslim, 17.5% Hindu, 1.0% Buddhist, 16.7% None
Median income: $33,200 (2020)

Average income: $41,760 (2020)

Members of Parliament

This riding has elected the following members of the House of Commons of Canada:

Election results

See also
 List of Canadian federal electoral districts
 Past Canadian electoral districts

References

Riding history from the Library of Parliament
2011 results from Elections Canada
 Campaign expense data from Elections Canada

Notes

Federal electoral districts of Toronto
Ontario federal electoral districts
Scarborough, Toronto
2003 establishments in Ontario